The Maharashtra Maritime Board is governmental organisation in the state of Maharashtra, India. The board is tasked with the administration of ports and harbours, conservancy, licensing of crafts, levying of fees, regulation and control of traffic. Maharashtra Maritime Board (MMB) came into existence in 1996 and Commissioner, Water Transport was re-designated as chief executive officer, MMB.

Commissionerate of Water Transport was formed in 1990 by amalgamating 3 departments within the Port Organisation, i.e. CPO, Hydrographer and Marine Engineer, for better co-ordination and to promote development of minor and intermediate ports in the State of Maharashtra, and to administer, control and manage these ports.

Background 
Maharashtra is bestowed with a coastline of 720 km, of which Greater Mumbai District has approximately 114 km, Thane District 127 km, Raigad District 122 km, Ratnagiri District 237 km, and Sindhudurg District 120 km. There are 48 Intermediate & Non-Major Ports and 35 creeks on this coastline. The Port Organisation under the Buildings and Communications Department was formed by the State Government on 1 April 1963 under the control of Chief Ports Officer – Maharashtra State. Administration of ports and harbours, conservancy, licensing of crafts, levying of fees and regulation/ control of traffic etc. were entrusted to this organisation.

There are 48 intermediate and minor ports situated on the coast of Maharashtra, which are organised in five Groups, each headed by a Port Officer. Following five groups of ports were formed, which are each headed by a Port Officer:

For better co-ordination between its three branches vide GR dated 31 August 1990 the State Government created a post of Commissioner, Water Transport as Head of Department of the state’s Port Organisation.

As a sequel to the liberalisation policy pursued by the Central Govt. in the early nineties, the State Govt. decided to transform this organization, thus far under the Commissioner, Water Transport, and constitute Maharashtra Maritime Board, with the Minister of Ports as its chairman.

Ports in Maharashtra 
Maharashtra has two major ports, Mumbai Port and Jawaharlal Nehru Port (JNP) both located in Mumbai harbour. While Mumbai port has been acting as one of the major gateways for more than a century, JNP since its establishment in 1990s has emerged as a premier container handling port, accounting for almost 55% of the container traffic movement amongst the major ports in India.

The operational minor ( non-major) ports under Maharashtra Maritime Board( MMB) handling cargo include the ports at Dahanu, Tarapur, Dharamtar, Ulwa-Belapur, Trombay, Revdanda, Dighi, Dabhol, Bankot, Kelshi, Ratnagiri, Jaigad, Vijaydurg and Redi. The total cargo handled at  the minor ports increased from 8.5 Million Tonnes in  2002-03 to 11.1 Million Tonnes in 2005-06. The cargo commodities handled at the minor ports are bulk cargo and include coal, clinker, iron ore, limestone, cement, bauxite, sand, LPG, molasses etc.

MMB has also conceptualised Inland Water Transport projects under the centrally sponsored Scheme of Ministry of Shipping, GoI. Some of these include -
 From South Mumbai to Amba River/Dharamtar Creek at Mandwa
 In Mhasla / Mandad River (Rajpuri Creek) at Dighi
 From South Mumbai to Amba River/Dharamtar Creek at Rewas
 For eco-tourism project at Isapur, District Nanded, Maharashtra
Efforts are also on to develop passenger water transport projects around Mumbai.

Board

Functions 
The functions of the Maharashtra Maritime board are:
 Development of Minor Ports and Harbours for promoting cargo movement with a view to boost the economic activity along the coastline and  state's  hinterland.	 
 Enforcement of Maritime  Rules  & regulations for administration and conservancy of ports, for regulating traffic and tariff structure  and licensing  of crafts etc. 
 Development of Inland Water Transport for cargo as well as for passenger movement in the inland waterways within  the state. 
 To carry out Hydrographic Surveys and other allied investigations along the west coast of Maharashtra in the creeks as well as in the rivers of the Konkan region. 
 To carry out various functions assigned to it by the GOM from time to time.

Performance Highlights 
The following are the performance highlights of the Maharashtra Maritime Board:
 Jaigad Port (Developer: M/s JSW Jaigarh Port Limited) inaugurated on 22 August 2009.
 Construction of LNG terminal promoted by M/s RGPP Ltd. Completed, and is likely to receive first LNG vessel by early 2010.
 Construction of Dighi Port developed by Dighi Port Ltd. is under progress and its 1st berth is likely to be commissioned in March 2010.
 Shipyard construction at Usgaon, Dabhol, Dist. Ratnagiri promoted by M/s Bharati Shipyard for building ships up to 100,000 dwt is currently underway.
 In May 2007, Environmental clearance obtained for Rewas-Aware Port to be developed by Rewas Port Ltd. (under Reliance Group) with a capital investment of Rs. 6,000 Crores (Rupees 6 Billion).

Developments

Port Project 
The Government of Maharashtra has encouraged development of port sector and adopted an investor-friendly Port Policy. The port policy has evolved over the years with considerable changes during 1996, 2000, 2002. The salient features of the port policy are:
 Development on Build, Own, Operate, Share and Transfer (BOOST) basis
 Concession period of 50 years
 Concessional Wharfage on cargo handling at port
 If available, Govt. land on lease at market valuation
 Equity participation in SPV by MMB up to 11%
 Whereas, road linkage to nearest State Highway are to be partly funded by the State, development of roads within port limits will be the responsibility of developer.
 Freedom given to developer to fix tariffs
 Government to appoint two Directors on SPV company formed for port development

Upcoming ports in Maharashtra 
In our endeavour to develop the port sector for meeting the requirements of India’s growing economy and to address the needs of its industry, we have entered into six Concession Agreements for development of minor ports, namely:
 Rewas-Aware Port
 Dighi Port
 Jaigad Port (Dhamankhol Bay)
 Jaigad Port (Lavgan)
 Vijaydurg Port
 Redi Port
 Yogayatan Port (Mankhurd)

Multipurpose Terminals 
The Government of Maharashtra has declared a policy for construction of multipurpose jetties on 19 August 2005 to promote transportation of cargoes through short-sea shipping (SSS — Coastal Route).These Jetties can also handle international cargo through lighter-age operations.

Salient Features of the policy 
 Site Identification be done by the developer
 Project will be developed on Build, Own, Operate & Transfer (BOOT) basis
 Period of concession will be up to a maximum of 30 years, which includes 2 years for construction
 Techno-Economic Feasibility (TEFS) Report from the developer is a necessary requirement
 Public Notification (Swiss challenge)
 
MMB invites entrepreneurs to set up multi purpose terminals along the Maharashtra coast-line for their multipurpose cargoes. These terminals would be of great help to cope with the surging need for maritime infrastructure, especially port facilities.

Multi-purpose terminals in operation

Permissions granted to multi-purpose terminals

Captive Jetties 
In order to facilitate import of raw materials and export of finished goods for industries located on Maharashtra’s coastal belt, the Government has floated a policy for construction of captive jetties on its coast. The broad features of the policy are:
 Land and site for jetty will be leased out to the developer on concession basis for a period of 30 years
 Project will be developed on Build, Operate & Transfer (BOT) basis
 No berthing dues levied on vessels calling at these captive jetties
 Wharfage charges as per the tariffs notified by the State Government from time-to-time
 Jetty, superstructure & its supra-structure facilities to revert to MMB at the end of 30 years concession period

Captive terminals in operation

Projects in progress

Permissions  given by MMB

Shipyards 
MMB is encouraging private developers to set up shipyards on the Maharashtra coast.
Government offers following incentives:
 MMB offers suitable waterfront to the developers as per the requirements of the project 
 Inter-tidal land can be made available to the developers 
 If available, Government land can be made available to the developer

Shipyards in operation

Shipyard permissions given by MMB

Inland Water Transport 
Maharashtra has 35 creeks and rivers spread across 720 km long coast line. As per available information, approx. 15 million passengers in the coastal districts of the state use Inland Water Transport annually. The State Government has recognized the importance of Inland Water Transport and has tasked MSRDC as the implementing agency for development of passenger jetties on the Western Coast of Mumbai from Nariman Point to Borivali and on the Eastern Coast of Mumbai from South Mumbai to Navi Mumbai.
The Government of India, Ministry of Shipping under centrally sponsored scheme for development of inland water transport has approved eight projects in Maharashtra State at an estimated cost of Rs. 30 crores. The sites approved are Vishnupuri and Isapur in district Nanded, and Karanja, Mandwa, Rajpuri, Janjira, Dighi, and Agardanda in district Raigad. These projects are at various stages of implementation.
The minor ports of Maharashtra together handled around 130.48 lakh passenger traffic during April to December, 2006 of which 118.70 lakh passenger traffic was through mechanised vessels and 12.7 lakh was by non-mechanised vessels. Maharashtra Maritime Board (MMB) is developing the following IWT projects under the Centrally Sponsored Scheme of Ministry of Shipping, GoI and includes:
 In Godavari River at Vishnupuri, Nanded
 From South Mumbai to Amba River/Dharamtar Creek at Mandwa
 From South Mumbai to Amba River/Dharamtar Creek at Karanja
 In Mhasla/Mandad River (Rajpuri Creek) at Rajpuri
 In Mhasla/Mandad River (Rajpuri Creek) at Janjira Fort
 In Mhasla / Mandad River (Rajpuri Creek) at Dighi
 In Mhasla/Mandad River (Rajpuri Creek) at Agardanda
 From South Mumbai to Amba River/Dharamtar Creek at Rewas
 For eco-tourism project at Isapur, District Nanded, Maharashtra

MMB has also formulated the following projects for IWT development which are under consideration by Ministry of Shipping, Government of India: 
 From South Mumbai to Amba river / Dharamtar creek at Rewas
 For eco-tourism project at Isapur, District Nanded, Maharashtra
MMB is also planning to develop passenger water transport projects around Mumbai.
Following is the proposed network –

Marina 
Marina development is a popular leisure activity throughout the world and reflects the economic development of an area. Due to high-end economic activities in the state, there is huge potential for developing marinas. Marinas attract users of speed boats & yachts and promote tourism. They also give rise to ancillary activities e.g. construction, maintenance facilities and logistic support for leisure activities; which in turn generate employment. Marinas would also help decongest water areas by eliminating un-authorised/ un-organised anchorages.

Short-listed probable sites in and around Mumbai are:
 Mandwa
 Belapur
 Vasai Creek
 Malad Creek
 Dharamtar Creek

Tourism & Water Sports 
Dist. Sindhudurg, especially Malvan has already been declared as a marine park. This site has all the ingredients to be developed into a place of tourist attraction. This area is an ideal location for tourism and water sports activities. In addition, other potential area identified by the investors may also be considered for developing tourism and water sport activities.
 To facilitate tourism and water sports, MMB encourages:	
 Utilization of waterfront along the beach areas for tourism activities – in liaison with MTDC
 Promoting water sports in sheltered areas (with due safety for all users)

Wings of MMB

Marine Engineering Department 
Chief Surveyor and Marine Engineer, Maharashtra Maritime Board is the Head of Department of Marine Engineering and Survey Section. This department undertakes Maintenance, Repairs and Operation of Floating Crafts. Currently, Maharashtra Maritime Board has 1 Dredger, 2 Barges, 1 Tug, 1 Mooring launch, 3 Survey Launches and 6 Speed Boats.
The Marine Engineering Department looks after designing & acquisition of marine crafts, development of dredging units, and execution of dredging activities. Department also undertakes acquisition and maintenance of navigational aids such as Buoys, Light Buoys, Beacons, Navigational Lights and Storm Warning Signals etc.
At present MMB has 47 Light-houses at various ports, 29 Navigational Buoys in navigational channels and 37 Storm warning signals to assist the fishermen, passenger traffic and commercial ships at various ports. Under Inland Vessel Act 1917, this department conducts surveys, inspections and certification of vessels. It also conducts examinations for granting Certificates of Competency as 1st Class Master, 2nd Class Master, Serang, Engineer, 1st Class Engine Driver and 2nd Class Engine Driver, after the applicants secure requisite I.V. service for appearing these examinations.

Survey under Inland Vessel Act, 1917 

Survey of Inland Vessels is conducted by the Chief Surveyor and Marine Engineer of the MMB. Inspection of I.V.s plying in inland waterways is carried out for checking their performance and suitability i.e. sea-keeping aspects in sheltered waters.

On payment of government prescribed fees by an applicant, MMB Surveyor boards a vessel for a reasonable time to inspect the vessel’s structure, machinery, equipments and appliances viz. life saving appliances, fire fighting equipments and navigational aids, underwater hull inspection reports, and certificates of Master and Engine Driver. Surveyor also conducts enquiry in case of an accident.

The approved (by a Naval Architect) drawings and plans of the craft, which is under construction and intending to ply in inland waterways, throughout all its construction stages and final reports of trial of the vessel for seaworthiness, inclining experiment for stability, are to be sent for inspection by the MMB Surveyor.

If the surveyor is fully satisfied as to all the requirements having been complied with, and defects on the vessel, if any, is rectified to his full satisfaction, then he issues a declaration of survey to the applicant and also issues temporary certificate of survey.

The applicant on receipt of  the declaration of  survey delivers the papers (all copies of Life Saving Equipments, Fire Fighting Appliances and Master’s & Driver’s certificates along with the declaration ) to the O/o Chief Surveyor and Marine Engineer and takes the delivery of  Certificate of Survey within 7 days. Unless specifically requested by the applicant, Certificate of Survey is not transmitted by post.

Hydrographic Department 
Hyrographer is the Head of the Hydrographic department within the MMB. Various hydrographic studies are carried out under his supervision.

These studies help establish need for dredging in the identified areas. He undertakes pre and post Hydrographic Surveys for dredging requirements and has a data bank of over 1150 bathymetric charts, which are made available to the users on payment.

He also undertakes surveys related to navigational safety and port development, provides bathymetric data for all potential sites for planning and execution of various projects, and undertakes the work of publication of Tides every year.
The Hydrographic Department has three full-fledged survey parties which are equipped with latest hydrographic equipment like Differential Global Positioning System (DGPS), dual frequency echo sounders, current meters, automatic tide gauge, digital level & HYPACK Hydrographic Software.

Civil Engineering Department 
 Responsible for construction, maintenance and repairs of all types of civil constructions of MMB.	
 Undertakes construction of new buildings and port infrastructure
 Works undertaken through MMB’s own funds.
 62 works worth Rs.9.55 crores are in progress.
 Annual Budget of Rs.14 crores provided by MMB.
 Around 300 passenger jetties - Detailed survey being undertaken to confirm present status.

Coastal Protection Works 
 Coastal Protection Works are carried out through Coastal Engineer under PWD and funds are provided through DPDC (Rs.15-20 crores)
 There is no State Level Scheme to provide for coastal protection.
 Out of total 720 km of coastline, 400.49 km is naturally protected and 141.84 km has been artificially protected. The remaining 177.67 km is vulnerable to erosion and needs to be protected is proposed. Funds required to protect 177.67 km is Rs.1322 crores over next 15 years. A State Level Scheme
 Maintenance funds are not provided till date.  So, Rs.30 crores per year for next three years and thereafter Rs.15 crores per year are required.

Regional Port Offices 
The list of offices are as follows:

See also 
 Ports in India
 Official Website of Maharashtra Maritime Board

References 

Specialist law enforcement agencies of India
Maritime organizations
Water transport in India
State agencies of Maharashtra